The Snows of Kilimanjaro may refer to:

"The Snows of Kilimanjaro" (short story), a short story by Ernest Hemingway first published in Esquire in 1936
The Snows of Kilimanjaro (short story collection), also known as The Snows of Kilimanjaro and Other Stories, a collection of short stories by Hemingway, published in 1961
Kilimandjaro (song), a French-language song by Pascal Danel known in that language as "Les Neiges du Kilimandjaro" (which translates to "The Snows of Kilimanjaro") 
The Snows of Kilimanjaro (1952 film), a 1952 American film
The Snows of Kilimanjaro (2011 film), a 2011 French film